Marvin E. Miller Jr. (December 13, 1945 – September 30, 2016) was a Republican member of the Pennsylvania House of Representatives.

References

Republican Party members of the Pennsylvania House of Representatives
2016 deaths
1945 births
Politicians from Lancaster, Pennsylvania